Britannia metal (also called britannium or Britannia ware) is a specific type of  pewter alloy, favoured for its silvery appearance and smooth surface. The composition by weight is typically about 92% tin, 6% antimony, and 2% copper.

Britannia metal is usually spun rather than cast, and  melts at 255 degrees Celsius.

History

Britannia metal was first produced in 1769 or 1770. James Vickers created it after purchasing the formula from a dying friend. It was originally known as "Vickers White Metal" when made under contract by the Sheffield manufacturers Ebenezer Hancock and Richard Jessop. In 1776 James Vickers took over the manufacturing himself and remained as owner until his death in 1809, when the company passed to his son John and son-in-law Elijah West. In 1836 the company was sold to John Vickers's nephew Ebenezer Stacey (the son of Hannah Vickers and John Stacey).

After the development of electroplating with silver in 1846, Britannia metal was widely used as the base metal for silver-plated household goods and cutlery. The abbreviation EPBM on such items denotes "electroplated Britannia metal". Britannia metal was generally used as a cheaper alternative to electroplated nickel silver (EPNS) which is more durable.

Until 2016, britannium was used to make the solid core of the Oscar statuettes. The 8½ lb (4 kg) statuettes were Britannia metal plated with gold. The awards have since changed to a bronze core.

In his essay "A Nice Cup of Tea", writer George Orwell asserts that "britanniaware" teapots "produce inferior tea" when compared to chinaware.

See also

Britannia silver
English pewter (approximately 91% tin, 7.5% antimony and 1.5% copper)
Nickel silver ('German silver')
Reed & Barton

References

Fusible alloys
Tin alloys